Colin Fleming and Ross Hutchins were the defending champions but they were defeated in the quarterfinals by Eric Butorac and Rik de Voest.

The fourth seeded team of Treat Conrad Huey and Dominic Inglot defeated Jonathan Marray and Frederik Nielsen in the final to take the title, 6–4, 6–7(9–11), [10–8].

Seeds

Draw

Draw

References
 Main Draw

Aegon Trophy - Doubles
2012 Men's Doubles